Aaliyah Edwards (born July 9, 2002) is a Canadian college basketball player for the UConn Huskies of the Big East Conference.

College Career
Edwards is currently a junior playing with the UConn Huskies women's basketball team. She is averaging a double-double of 18.3 points and 11.0 boards per game. That is more than twice as good as her sophomore season, when she averaged 7.9 points and 5.1 rebounds per game. The junior forward became the first UConn player with 20 points and 20 rebounds since Maya Moore in 2010.

National Team Career
Edwards has won silver at the 2017 FIBA Under-16 Women's Americas Championship as part of the junior team, and then silver with the senior team at the 2019 FIBA Women's AmeriCup.

In July 2021, Edwards was named to Canada's 2020 Olympic team.

Career Statistics

College

|-
| style="text-align:left;"| 2020–21
| style="text-align:left;"| UConn
| 29 || 6 || 21.8 || 68.9 || 0.0 || 63.6 || 5.7 || 0.9 || 1.0 || 1.0 || 2.0 || 10.7 

|-
| style="text-align:left;"| 2021–22
| style="text-align:left;"| UConn
| 36 || 26 || 24.9 || 52.1 || 40.0 || 74.0 || 5.1 || 1.4 || 1.1 || 0.5 || 2.1 || 7.9 

|-
| style="text-align:left;"| 2022–23
| style="text-align:left;"| UConn
| 15 || 15 || 32.1 || 63.4 || 100.0 || 75.4 || 9.5 || 2.8 || 1.0 || 1.1 || 2.8 || 16.5
|}

Awards and honors
 Big East All-Tournament team (2023)

Personal Life
Aaliyah Edwards was born in Kingston, Ontario, to parents Jacqueline and Sanford Edwards. She wears purple and yellow braids to pay homage to the Los Angeles Lakers and Kobe Bryant.

References

External Links
 UConn Huskies bio
 
 
 
 

2002 births
Living people
Basketball people from Ontario
Black Canadian basketball players
Canadian expatriate basketball people in the United States
Canadian women's basketball players
Sportspeople from Kingston, Ontario
UConn Huskies women's basketball players
Basketball players at the 2020 Summer Olympics
Olympic basketball players of Canada
All-American college women's basketball players